Events in the year 1949 in Norway.

Incumbents
 Monarch – Haakon VII
 Prime Minister – Einar Gerhardsen (Labour Party)

Events
 October 10 – The 1949 Parliamentary election takes place.
 November 20 – Hurum air disaster: an Aero Holland Douglas DC-3 crashes near Hurum, Norway, killing 34 of the 35 on board, including 26 Jewish children from Tunisia on their way to Norway, as an intermediary stop before immigrating to Israel.

Popular culture

Sports

 Martin Stokken, cross country skier and athlete, is awarded the Egebergs Ærespris for excellence in more than one sport, and the Norwegian Sportsperson of the Year.

Music

Film

Literature
 The Knut Hamsund novel Paa gjengrodde Stier (On Overgrown Paths), was published.

Notable births

7 January – Bente Erichsen, culture director
7 February – Oddvar Einarson, film director
2 April – Per Husby, jazz musician and orchestra leader
10 April – Ingolf Håkon Teigene, journalist and editor (died 2007)
29 April – Hæge Follegg Pedersen, children's writer.
3 May – Esben Esther Pirelli Benestad, doctor and sexologist
14 May – Sverre Årnes, novelist
19 May – Inga Kvalbukt, politician
30 May
Bjørn T. Grydeland, civil servant and diplomat
Ove Thorsheim, Norwegian diplomat
20 June – Synnøve Korssjøen, goldsmith, jewellery designer.
30 September – Lars Klevstrand, singer, guitarist, and composer.
8 November – Clement Endresen, judge
10 November – Aud Gaundal, politician
18 November – Sverre Diesen, military officer and Chief of Defence of Norway
18 November – Knut Magne Flølo, politician 
30 November – Petter Henriksen, musician and publisher.
6 December – Bjørn Hvinden, sociologist
9 December – Anne Enger, politician
14 December – Inger Lise Rypdal, singer and actress

Notable deaths

25 January – Leon Aurdal, painter (born 1890). 
5 February – Rudolf Elias Peersen, politician and Minister (born 1868)
14 February – Lise Stauri, educator (born 1882).
21 February – Anders Beer Wilse, photographer (born 1865)
2 June – Gudbrand Bernhardsen Tandberg, politician (born 1903)
10 June – Sigrid Undset, novelist, awarded the Nobel Prize in Literature in 1928 (born 1882)
12 July – Kirsten Utheim Toverud, pediatrician (born 1890).
13 July – Nils Tveit, politician (born 1876)
15 July – Erik Solem, judge (born 1877)
8 August – Eivind Kristoffer Eriksen, politician (born 1893)
8 October – Erik Ørvig, sailor and Olympic gold medallist (born 1895)
4 December – Ivar Lykke, politician and Prime Minister of Norway (born 1872)
22 December – Ole Reistad, military officer and pentathlete (born 1898).

See also

References

External links